Richard Marciano Hickman, Jr. (born September 1, 1985) is an American-Georgian professional basketball player who last played for Pallacanestro Trieste of the Italian Lega Basket Serie A (LBA). He represents the Georgian national basketball team in international competitions. Hickman helped lead Maccabi Tel Aviv to a EuroLeague title in 2014, earning an All-EuroLeague Second Team selection in the process.

High school
Hickman attended East Forsyth High School, where he played high school basketball, from 1999 to 2003.

College career
After high school, Hickman attended UNC-Greensboro, where he played varsity school college basketball for four years. He played with the school's UNC Greensboro Spartans, from 2003 to 2007.

Professional career
Hickman played with the professional basketball teams Otopeni in Romania, Gießen 46ers in Germany, and Namika Lahti in Finland, before joining the Italian 2nd Division team Junior Casale in 2010. In July 2011, he signed with Scavolini Pesaro for the 2011–12 season.

Hickman signed a two-year contract with the Israeli Super League team Maccabi Tel Aviv in 2012. In May 2014, he was named to the All-EuroLeague Second Team. Hickman helped Maccabi to win the EuroLeague title that season, along with teammates Tyrese Rice, Sofoklis Schortsanitis, and David Blu.

On July 1, 2014, he signed a two-year contract with the Turkish Super League club Fenerbahçe. On March 26, 2015, he suffered the Achilles tendon rupture injury in his right leg, which sidelined him off the court for the rest of season. Over 17 EuroLeague games, he averaged 9 points, 2.5 rebounds, and 2 assists per game, while also averaging 8 points and 2.6 assists over 15 Turkish League games. His team eventually advanced to the EuroLeague Final Four for the first time in team's history. On May 15, 2015, however, they lost in the semi-final game to Real Madrid, by a score of 87–96.

On July 26, 2016, Hickman signed a 1+1 deal with Italian League club EA7 Emporio Armani Milano. On July 14, 2017, Hickman signed a two-year contract with German League club Brose Bamberg.

Hickman began the 2019–20 season as a free agent. On 6th January 2020, he signed with the Italian club Pallacanestro Trieste, for the second half remainder of the season.

National team career
Hickman represented the senior Georgian national team in national team competitions. With Georgia, he played at the 2013 EuroBasket, where he averaged 11.8 points, 4.4 rebounds, and 1.6 assists per game, over 5 group stage games.

Career statistics

EuroLeague

|-
| style="text-align:left;"| 2012–13
| style="text-align:left;" rowspan=2| Maccabi
| 27 || 27 || 28.9 || .448 || .356 || .784 || 2.7 || 3.1 || 1.4 || .2 || 13.5 || 14.9
|-
| style="text-align:left;background:#AFE6BA;"| 2013–14 †
| 30 || 26 || 28.7 || .440 || .326 || .752 || 2.6 || 2.7 || .8 || .1 || 12.2 || 11.2
|-
| style="text-align:left;"| 2014–15
| style="text-align:left;" rowspan=2| Fenerbahçe
| 17 || 4 || 22.1 || .333 || .328 || .800 || 2.5 || 2.0 || 1.1 || .1 || 9.0 || 7.7
|-
| style="text-align:left;"| 2015–16
| 20 || 3 || 11.9 || .423 || .310 || .793 || 1.3 || 1.3 || .4 || .0 || 4.6 || 4.7
|-
| style="text-align:left;"| 2016–17
| style="text-align:left;"| Milano
| 30 || 20 || 25.0 || .419 || .349 || .802 || 2.6 || 3.3 || .8 || .1 || 10.1 || 10.4
|- class="sortbottom"
| style="text-align:left;"| Career
| style="text-align:left;"|
| 94 || 60 || 24.0 || .423 || .339 || .776 || 2.3 || 2.4 || .9 || .1 || 10.4 || 10.2

References

External links
 Ricky Hickman at eurobasket.com
 Ricky Hickman at euroleague.net
 Ricky Hickman at archive.fiba.com
 Ricky Hickman at fiba.com
 Ricky Hickman at legabasket.it 
 Ricky Hickman at sports-reference.com
 Ricky Hickman at tblstat.net
 

1985 births
Living people
American expatriate basketball people in Finland
American expatriate basketball people in Germany
American expatriate basketball people in Israel
American expatriate basketball people in Italy
American expatriate basketball people in Romania
American expatriate basketball people in Turkey
American men's basketball players
A.S. Junior Pallacanestro Casale players
Basketball players from Winston-Salem, North Carolina
Brose Bamberg players
Fenerbahçe men's basketball players
Giessen 46ers players
Lega Basket Serie A players
Maccabi Tel Aviv B.C. players
Men's basketball players from Georgia (country)
Namika Lahti players
Olimpia Milano players
Point guards
Shooting guards
UNC Greensboro Spartans men's basketball players
Victoria Libertas Pallacanestro players